Anoplohydrus is a genus of snakes in the family Natricidae that contains the sole species Anoplohydrus aemulans.

It is found on the island of Sumatra in Indonesia.

References 

Natricinae
Monotypic snake genera
Taxa named by Franz Werner